Kandiah is a Tamil male given name. Due to the Tamil tradition of using patronymic surnames it may also be a surname for men and women.

People

Given name
 P. Kandiah (1914–1960), Ceylonese politician
 V. A. Kandiah (1891–1963), Ceylonese politician

Surname
 Arumugam Kandaiah Premachandran (born 1957), Sri Lankan politician
 Arumugam Kandiah Sarveswaran, Sri Lankan politician
 Kandiah Arulanandan(1925–2004), Ceylonese engineer and academic
 Kandiah Balasegaran (1965–2008), Sri Lankan rebel
 Kandiah Balendra (born 1940), Sri Lankan businessman
 Kandiah David Arulpragasam (1931–2003), Sri Lankan academic
 Kandiah Kamalesvaran (born 1934), Australian singer
 Kandiah Kanagaratnam (1892–1952), Ceylonese politician
 Kandiah Navaratnam (born 1935), Sri Lankan politician
 Kandiah Neelakandan (born 1947), Sri Lankan lawyer
 Kandiah Sivanesan, Sri Lankan politician
 Kandiah Thirugnansampandapillai Francis (1939–2013), Sri Lankan cricket official
 Kandiah Ulaganathan (1966–2006), Sri Lankan rebel

See also
 

Tamil masculine given names